Per Johannes Hopf (born 16 June 1987) is a Swedish former professional footballer who played as a goalkeeper. He played professionally in Sweden with Hammarby IF as well as in Turkey with Gençlerbirliği S.K. and Ankaragücü.

Club career

Hammarby
Hopf joined Hammarby in the summer of 2008 after impressing on a trial with the club. He signed a -year contract with the Stockholm-based club. During the 2009 season, he was on loan to the affiliated team Hammarby TFF where he was awarded best goalkeeper in the Swedish fourth tier.

He made his first game for Hammarby in the final game of the 2009 Allsvenskan, against BK Häcken, with the club already set for relegation. Hammarby were defeated, 1–0.

In 2010, he started on the bench, being second choice behind former Swedish national team goalkeeper, Rami Shaaban. But after weak appearances by the latter, he soon established himself as first choice.

Hopf was voted Player of the Year in Hammarby IF in 2010 in competition with the Genoa-departed forward Linus Hallenius. He was again voted Player of the year in 2012 after an impressive season.

Among other achievements he won two penalty shootouts for his team to secure Hammarby IF a place in the 2010 Swedish Cup Final. He was appointed Man of the match when his side lost 1–0 to Helsingborg.

Gençlerbirliği
On 27 May 2015, Hopf signed a three-year deal with the Süper Lig club Gençlerbirliği S.K. He made his debut on 29 August 2015 in a 1–0 win against Kasımpaşa. Hopf was voted Gençlerbirliği's player of the year in both 2016 and 2017.

Ankaragücü
Hopf signed for Ankaragücü in the summer of 2018. His contract was terminated on 6 March 2019. Hopf made eight official appearances for the club.

Retirement
Hopf announced his retirement from professional football on 11 May 2020, not being able to recover from a serious hip injury.

International career
Hopf received his first call up to the senior Sweden squad in March 2016 for friendlies against Turkey and Czech Republic, but did not play. He was on stand-by for Sweden's 2018 FIFA World Cup squad. He ended his professional career without winning an international cap for Sweden.

Career statistics

Honours
Hammarby TFF
 Division 2 Östra Svealand: 2010

Hammarby
Superettan: 2014

Individual
 Gençlerbirliği Player of the Year: 2015–16, 2016–17

References

External links

1987 births
Living people
Association football goalkeepers
Swedish footballers
Allsvenskan players
Superettan players
Süper Lig players
Hammarby Talang FF players
Hammarby Fotboll players
Gençlerbirliği S.K. footballers
Swedish expatriate footballers
Swedish expatriate sportspeople in Turkey
Expatriate footballers in Turkey